A number of German vessels have been named Lübeck for the city of Lübeck:

German corvette Lübeck (F269) of the Braunschweig class.

German Navy ship names